Dominick & Haff was an American silver manufacturer based in New York City. It was co-founded by Henry Blanchard Dominick and Leroy B. Haff in 1872, incorporated in 1889, and it closed down in 1928. The firm designed pots, mugs, centerpieces, spoons, tea sets and kettles. Examples can be seen at the Metropolitan Museum of Art, the Brooklyn Museum, Cooper Hewitt, the Indianapolis Museum of Art, the Art Institute of Chicago, the Museum of Fine Arts, Houston, and the Rhode Island School of Design Museum.

References

1872 establishments in New York (state)
Companies based in New York City
American companies established in 1872
American companies disestablished in 1928
1928 disestablishments in New York (state)
American silversmiths